Wallace Worsley Jr. (June 27, 1908 – June 18, 1991) was an American director and production manager. The son of Wallace Worsley, he directed 34 films between 1939 and 1968. In 1982, he was awarded the Frank Capra Achievement Award.

References

External links 

 

1908 births
1991 deaths
People from Fort Wayne, Indiana
Film directors from Indiana